The Ramses II tank is a heavily modernized T-55 main battle tank designed for and used by the Egyptian Armed Forces. A single T-54 was sent to the United States for upgrading. A primary prototype was sent to Egypt where extensive trials were completed in late 1987. The tank finally entered production in 2004–2005. A total of 425 units have been produced. The tank was originally called the T-54E ("E" stands for "Egyptian").

At early stages, the upgrade was concerned with the firepower and mobility of the tank solely, while latter stages included the improvement of the level of protection as well. The tank's hull was modified to accommodate the new engine which had a great commonality with the one used by the M60A3 (the most numerous main battle tank in active Egyptian service), as a result an additional road wheel was added. The tank is armed with the same main gun used by Egyptian M60A3's, in addition to a sophisticated fire control system.

History of development
In November 1984, Teledyne Continental Motors (taken over by General Dynamics Land Systems) of the USA was awarded a contract to upgrade the firepower and mobility of a single T-54 tank. This was originally called the T-54E but was subsequently renamed Ramses II. The first prototype of the Ramses II was sent to Egypt for extensive firepower and mobility trials in January 1987 and these were completed in late 1987. Late in 1989, Egypt signed a technical assistance agreement with TCM to support the continued Egyptian testing of the Ramses II, with testing commencing in the summer of 1990. The tank finally entered production/conversion in 2004–2005 with 260 units so far modified from the stock of the T-54 available in the Egyptian Army arsenal.

Specifications
The upgrades and modifications, which resulted in an increase in the weight of the tank to 48 tons, are:

Fire Control System

SABCA Titan Mk I
A SABCA Titan Mk I laser fire-control system has been installed which includes:
 A modified Avimo TL10-T sight incorporating the laser range-finder
 An integrated in-eyepiece CRT alphanumeric graphic display
 An original SABCA double digital processor
 An image intensification periscopic night sight
 Automatic attitude and atmospheric sensors and associated control boxes
 A new communications system

Mobility

The hull section has been modified to accommodate the new power pack, consisting of:
 A TCM AVDS-1790-5A turbocharged diesel developing 908 hp (which has 80 per cent commonality with the engine installed in the M60A3 MBT)
 A Renk RK-304 transmission
 Two new exhaust pipes, one either side of the hull rear, replace the single exhaust outlet in the left side of the hull
 A new fuel tank. As a result of the lengthening of the hull (the Ramses II is nearly one meter longer than the T-54/55 and with an added wheel on each side)
 A new final drives
 A new General Dynamics Land Systems, Model 2880 in-arm hydro-pneumatic suspension units each fitted with:
 An M48-type road wheel
 Idler at the front
 Large drive sprocket at the rear
 Two new track-return rollers and US pattern tracks replacing the original Russian tracks

Armament
 The Gun system has had the following modifications:
 The gun and turret stabilisation system are provided by HR Textron Incorporated of the United States
 The original DT-10T 100 mm gun has been replaced by the 105 mm M68 ordnance which is already fitted in the Egyptian M60A3 MBTs
 The original breech of the 100 mm DT-10T gun has been retained and modified and the recoil system has also been modified
 A muzzle reference system is fitted as standard
 An M60 day/ night searchlight is mounted over the 105 mm gun
 A collective type NBC system has been installed
 Has IR vision for the gunner and driver
 An image intensification for the commander
 A laser range-finder with ballistic computer for the gunner

Protection
 Active and passive protection has been upgraded by:
 Armor protection has been added as have armored side skirts
 A modern NBC overpressure system
 A new air filtration system
 A fire detection and suppression system
 Mounts 6 electrically operated smoke grenade launchers on each side of the turret
 The hatch layout has been retained
 British Blair Catton tracks
 A new turret basket

Operators
 
  - 425 with plans for additional conversion of 140-160

See also

 Main battle tank
 Egyptian Army

Related developments
 T-54
 T-55

Comparable vehicles
 TR-85
 Al-Zarrar
 Type 59G(BD) Durjoy
 Type-69IIG
 M60-2000 Main Battle Tank (/)
 Sabra (tank) (/)

Related lists
 List of armoured fighting vehicles by country

References
 http://mainbattletanks.czweb.org/Tanky/Ramses2.htm 

Main battle tanks of the Cold War
Main battle tanks of Egypt
Post–Cold War main battle tanks
Military vehicles introduced in the 2000s